Laura Nucci (1913–1994) was an Italian film actress. Nucci was one of the stars of the Fascist era, emerging after she won a competition. Her career was setback by the downfall of Benito Mussolini's regime, but from 1950 she began appearing in films again as a character actress. She also appeared in television, such as the 1957 series Pride and Prejudice.

Selected filmography
 La Leggenda di Wally (1930)
 Palio (1932)
 Bad Subject (1933)
 Dimmed Lights (1934)
 Golden Arrow (1935)
 The Dance of Time (1936)
 Condottieri (1937)
 We Were Seven Widows (1939)
 The Faceless Voice (1939)
 Diamonds (1939)
 The Knight of San Marco (1939)
 La signorina (1942)
 The Adventures of Fra Diavolo (1942)
 Rita of Cascia (1943)
 Disowned (1954)
 Call Girls of Rome (1960)
 The Lovely Lola (1962)
 Devil of the Desert Against the Son of Hercules (1964)
 We Still Kill the Old Way (1967)
 The Bloodstained Shadow (1978)
 Killer Nun (1978)
 Blow to the Heart (1982)
 Warrior of the Lost World (1983)

References

External links

1913 births
1994 deaths
Italian film actresses
20th-century Italian actresses